Fauzia Kasuri (born September 8, 1952) is a Pakistani politician who was until recently one of the central figures of Pakistan Tehreek-e-Insaf.

Career

Pakistan Tehreek-e-Insaf 
Kasuri is a former member and recent critic of the PTI, a political party in Pakistan. She resigned 2 months before the 2018 Pakistani General Elections. Apart from raising funds for the party, she had been President of the Women's Wing of the party for 17 years and was responsible for building women chapters of the party in Europe, the Middle East and the US. She had been a member of the Manifesto and Constitution Committees of the party and had played a leading role in nurturing the women and youth wings within the party.

She was a long time volunteer for the Shaukat Khanum Memorial Cancer Hospital & Research Centre, involved in international fund raising for the charity. Kasuri also had a long track record of fund raising for the Imran Khan Foundation. Having been affiliated with many social causes like SOS and the Layton Rahmatullah Benevolent Trust, she is also on the board of I-Care Foundation in Pakistan and was a leading figure for the relief work with the internally displaced persons from Waziristan.

Personal life and education
Fauzia Kasuri was born in Karachi, Pakistan. She studied at the Karachi American School and St Joseph's College, graduating with a Bachelor of Arts degree from the University of Karachi. She later joined the MBA program at the University of North Carolina, studying economics and statistics.

References

Living people
Pakistan Tehreek-e-Insaf politicians
1955 births
People from Islamabad
University of Karachi alumni
Karachi American School alumni
Pakistani emigrants to the United States
University of North Carolina alumni
Former United States citizens